The Legend of Prince Valiant is an American animated television series depicting the adventures of a young hero and his two friends as they train to join the Knights of the Round Table and defend King Arthur and Camelot. The series premiered on The Family Channel on September 3, 1991, and ended on June 25, 1993, with a total of 65 episodes over the course of 2 seasons.

Series overview

Episodes

Season 1 (1991–92) 
"No. in Series" refers to the sequence on the DVD release.

Season 2 (1992–93) 
The sequence on the DVD release is identical to the regular episode order, for season 2.

References

External links
 

Lists of fantasy television series episodes
Lists of American children's animated television series episodes